Karen Cho is a Chinese-Canadian documentary filmmaker in Montreal, Quebec, Canada. Her credits include the 2004 National Film Board of Canada (NFB) documentary In The Shadow Of Gold Mountain, documenting the effects of the Chinese Exclusion Act in Canada; the 2009 InformAction documentary Seeking Refuge; and the 2012 NFB documentary Status Quo? The Unfinished Business of Feminism in Canada, which was named best documentary at the Whistler Film Festival.

After graduating from the Mel Hoppenheim School of Cinema, Cho made In The Shadow Of Gold Mountain at the NFB via a program for emerging filmmakers of colour.

References

External links

Karen Cho at the English-Language Arts Network, "Recognizing Artists: Enfin Visibles!" Project
Karen Cho at the Asian Canadian Wiki
www.storyboothmedia.com
www.iworksonline.com

Asian-Canadian filmmakers
Canadian women film directors
Canadian documentary film directors
Film directors from Montreal
Concordia University alumni
Anglophone Quebec people
Living people
Year of birth missing (living people)
Canadian women documentary filmmakers